Rambaud may refer to:

 People
  (1516–1586), French grammarian and inventor of a new French alphabet
 Agathe de Rambaud (1764–1853), French nurse in charge of the Dauphin from 1785 to 1792
 Alfred Nicolas Rambaud (1842–1905), French historian
 Patrick Rambaud (born 1946), French writer

 Places
 Rambaud, Hautes-Alpes, France
 La Chapelle-Rambaud, Haute-Savoie, France